Kirari Assembly constituency is one of the seventy Delhi assembly constituencies of Delhi in northern India.
Kirari assembly constituency is a part of North West Delhi (Lok Sabha constituency). This constituency was created by reorganization by delimitation commission in 2008.

Members of Legislative Assembly
Key

Election results

2020

2015

2013

2008

References
 "Kirari Election Result 2020"

Assembly constituencies of Delhi
Delhi Legislative Assembly